Anni Ribelli is a 1996 Italian Argentine romantic drama film directed and written by Rosalia Polizzi. The film starred Leticia Brédice, Massimo Dapporto, Esther Goris and Alessandra Acciai. Actress Leticia Brédice won a Silver Condor Award for best actress in 1997 for her performance.

Cast
Massimo Dapporto as Francesco Loiacono 
Leticia Brédice as Laura 
Inda Ledesma as Aunt Francesca 
Esther Goris   
Juan Cruz Bordeu   
Alessandra Acciai as Dora Dalmonte 
Eva Burgos   
 
Adelaide Alessi as Grandmother 
Vera Czemerinski as Alumna ejemplar 
Vanina Fabiak   
Jorge García Marino   
Esther Gross as Giulietta 
Pablo Patlis as Mimi 
Alexis Puig as Militar 
Adriana Russo

Release
The film premiered in Argentina on 6 September 1996.

External links
 

1996 films
Italian multilingual films
Argentine multilingual films
1990s Italian-language films
1990s Spanish-language films
1996 romantic drama films
Films scored by Luis Bacalov
1990s Italian films
1990s Argentine films